Saunders v Anglia Building Society [1970] UKHL 5 also known as Gallie v Lee is an English contract law case in the United Kingdom. It established that in contract law the burden lies with the plaintiff to demonstrate he has not acted negligently and, that consequently, the plea of non est factum cannot normally be claimed by a person of full capacity.

Facts
Mrs Gallie, who had broken her spectacles, signed a document without first informing herself of its contents. She was lied to by her nephew's business partner, Mr Lee, that the documents were merely to confirm a gift of her house to her nephew. In fact, she signed papers allowing the nephew's business partner to grant a mortgage over the property in favour of Anglia Building Society. When the business partner defaulted on the mortgage, Anglia Building Society claimed to foreclose and repossess the House. Mrs Gallie died before the litigation reached the House of Lords, and was represented by Saunders.

Judgment

Court of Appeal
Lord Denning MR, reversing the judge’s decision, found that Mrs Gallie was out of luck. Grown literate people cannot simply get away with signing things, and not being bound.

House of Lords
The House of Lords upheld the Court of Appeal, though disapproving of the strength of Lord Denning’s criticisms.

Lord Reid said the defence is unavailable for the following reasons.

See also

English contract law
Mistakes in English law

Notes

References
CJ Miller 'Non Est Factum and Mistaken Identity' (1969) 32(4) Modern Law Review 431-435
J Stone, 'The limits of Non Est Factum after Gallie v Lee' (1972) 88 Law Quarterly Review 190

English contract case law
House of Lords cases
1970 in British law
1970 in case law